Toopy and Binoo is a Canadian children's Flash animated television series produced by Echo Média (New name) and broadcast by PBS Kids and Treehouse in English and Télé-Québec in French. It is based on the children's book Toupie et Binou. Another television series was produced as a live action spin-off show titled Toopy and Binoo Vroom Vroom Zoom, produced by Echo Media, which was developed into a mobile app still available for iOS. The show was licensed by American Treehouse and Radio Canada ,in 2009 for distribution to public television stations in the United States.

A total of 175 episodes were produced overall.

On May 26, 2021, it was announced that an 80-minute feature film was scheduled to release in theaters.

A teaser for the movie was released on the Toopy and Binoo channel in February 2023 confirming the release date as "August 11, 2023".

Plot
Toopy and Binoo is an animated series based on the popular books created by Dominique Jolin. Toopy is a funny, friendly, optimistic, impulsive mouse whose insatiable zest for life is matched only by his love for his best friend, Binoo. Binoo is a lovable cat who is logical, sensible, and thinks before he acts. Binoo is devoted to his best friend Toopy. The characters are charming and endearing. The kindness, respect, and gentle aspects of childhood friendship are emphasized as the friends explore and discover the world around them with their colorful adventures. Toopy and Binoo allows for learning in a non-didactic manner. Individual segments are approximately five minutes in length, but are frequently grouped together as one thirty-minute episode, both on television and DVD releases, and, the 30 minute episodes have other characters talk besides Toopy.

There are also short 2-minute episodes that are seen on the website in the second season, where, there are either "Magic You", "Captain You", or, "Fabulous You" segments, featuring Toopy and Binoo as space captains, fairies, or, as superheroes who make things right by using magic (Toopy sometimes ends it by doing the same thing that's wrong on himself which he doesn't even notice), and they use the magic wand from "Godmother Toopy", explore things in their house and pretend to find out what they are, and, Binoo sometimes reveals what they are, such as a pillow, where, they use the same uniforms they had in "Strange New World", but, instead, the object they find is the entire form of the planet, and, help their friends when they have nothing to play with by playing games they can use with themselves. They use the same uniforms they had in "Super Toopy", but, Binoo looks a lot like Super Toopy, also. The segments encourage viewers (referred to in the show as "Magic You", "Captain You", or, "Fabulous You") to participate in the adventures and use their imaginations. Each DVD that has two half-hour specials has two of each of these three short mini-episode adventures, starting in this order: "Magic You", "Captain You", and then, "Fabulous You".

To date , three series have been produced by Echo Média and a feature film aimed at cinemas across Canada is currently in production. August 11, 2023 will mark the pan- Canadian release in theaters.

History
Toupie et Binou was the original title of the children's books collection written by Dominique Jolin;  

Binoo then appeared in a small series of his own. Echo Media (formerly Spectra Animation) then brought them to television, both in English versions, dubbing their English names to Toopy and Binoo.

Seasons 1 and 2 have been broadcast in over 179 countries and dubbed into 30 languages, 1 million DVD's have been sold and YouTube videos have reached nearly 350 million views, for a total of 1.35 billion minutes viewed.

A third season of the television series, entiltled, Toopy and Binoo Vroom Vroom Zoom is produced in live 3D mode. Toopy and Binoo two lives shows, Marshmallow Moon , Fun and Games were presented across Canada and sold over 250,000 tickets

Characters
 Toopy (voiced by Frank Meschkuleit) is a funny, friendly, optimistic, impulsive mouse whose insatiable zest for life is matched only by his love for his best friend, Binoo. He wears a red-and-yellow T-shirt, and is one of the stars of the show. He has a wide imagination and takes Binoo to imaginary places created by the both of them and loves many different things, such as going on adventures with Toopy. Toopy is shown to really enjoy life in the show, and has a laugh line used in the credits, and some of the episodes. He is the only one to have a voice actor, who also voices every character in Dragon.
 Binoo is a small white cat who is one of the stars of the show and do not speak. Binoo is a lovable cat who is logical, sensible, and thinks before he acts. Binoo is devoted to his best friend Toopy. He communicates with signs and is friends with Toopy. He also has a stuffed toy called "Patchy-Patch"  He enjoys Patchy-Patch, reading books, and going on adventures.

Episodes

Series overview

Season 1 (2005) 

 The first season of Toopy and Binoo consists primarily of 104 4-minute segments in 26 full-length 24-minute episodes.
 In bubble transitions of the first season, there are scenarios of Toopy and Binoo playing with bubbles.

Season 2 (2006)

References

External links

 The official Toopy and Binoo website
 Toopy and Binoo on Treehouse Website
 Toopy and Binoo books in English from Orca Book Publishers
 Toopy and Binoo credits 
 Toopy & Binoo IMDB (TV Series 2005)
 Toopy and Binoo YouTube Channel https://www.youtube.com/user/toopyandbinootv

2000s Canadian animated television series
2000s Canadian children's television series
2005 Canadian television series debuts
2006 Canadian television series endings
Animated television series about cats
Animated television series about mice and rats
Canadian children's animated comedy television series
Canadian children's animated fantasy television series
Canadian flash animated television series
Canadian preschool education television series
Canadian television shows based on children's books
Animated preschool education television series
2000s preschool education television series
English-language television shows
PBS Kids shows
Television about magic
Television shows about dreams
Treehouse TV original programming